Sulo Arvi Pohjanpää (10 July 1887 – 21 December 1959) was a Finnish Olympic gymnast, judge and writer.

Gymnastics 

He won the Finnish national championship in team gymnastics as a member of Ylioppilasvoimistelijat in 1909.

Law 
He took his matriculation exam in Tampere real lycaeum in 1905. He graduated as a Master of Laws from the University of Helsinki in 1910. He received the title varatuomari in 1913.

Beginning in 1911, he worked various duties in the legal system. Eventually, he was a judge advocate general in the superior court martial in 1931–1952, and then a Judge of the Court of Appeal in the Helsinki Court of Appeal in 1952–1954.

He sentenced Martta Koskinen, the last woman executed in Finland, to death as chief justice of the case. He also was the chief justice in the case of Hella Wuolijoki and voted for death, although she received life imprisonment.

Literature 

He first published work was a short story collection Tuntureilta in 1913. His debut as a playwright, Vala, was premiered by the Finnish National Theatre in 1918. His play Jumalan käskynhaltija was adapted into film Jumalan tuomio in 1939.

He was the secretary of the Union of Finnish Writers in 1919–1920.

He used the pseudonym A.P:pää writing in newspapers.

Accolades 

He received the following honorary awards:
 Commemorative Medal of the Liberation war
 Commander of the White Rose of Finland, 1937
 Commemorative Medal of the Winter War
 Cross of Liberty, 3rd Class; 1940
 Cross of Liberty, 2nd Class; 1945
 Decoration for 40 years' faultless service, 1951

Family 

His parents were master tailor Kaarle Henrik Pohjanpää and Ida Vilhelmina Kourlaa. His first wife was Lempi Vilma Ranttila (1892–1947), married in 1922. They had children:
 Eila Helena Marjatta (1924–)
 Anja Meri Kristiina (1926–)
 Armi Elina Annikki (1933–1996), who married Pentti Siimes
His second wife was Aila Tellervo Heikinheimo (1919–), married in 1953.

He finnicized his familyname from Nordqvist to Pohjanpää in 1906.

Poet Lauri Pohjanpää was his brother.

Olympic diver Laura Kivelä was his granddaughter.

References

1887 births
1959 deaths
Writers from Helsinki
People from Uusimaa Province (Grand Duchy of Finland)
Finnish writers
Finnish male artistic gymnasts
Gymnasts at the 1908 Summer Olympics
Olympic gymnasts of Finland
Olympic bronze medalists for Finland
Olympic medalists in gymnastics
Medalists at the 1908 Summer Olympics
20th-century Finnish people